The Théâtre royal des Galeries (French; "Royal Theatre of the Galleries") is a theatre in central Brussels, Belgium, subsidised by the French Community of Belgium. It opened in 1847 and has continuously hosted theatrical activities ever since. It is located in the Royal Saint-Hubert Galleries and can be accessed from Brussels Central Station.

History
The Théâtre royal des Galeries was the first theatre to host the play adaptation of Victor Hugo's novel Les Misérables in 1863, which at the time was banned in France.

The repertoire includes Boulevard theatre and plays by Belgian dramatists, from serious drama to comedy. Furthermore, the company performs an end-of-year satirical Revue.

Thanks to its rich repertoire, this theatre's actors have become known beyond Brussels, especially with the play Le Mariage de mademoiselle Beulemans, which was recorded and broadcast in 1978 by the Belgian French-language public broadcaster RTBF. Iconic actors such as Christiane Lenain, Jacques Lippe and Ania Guedroitz took part in that performance, which was broadcast in Belgium and abroad.

The company is currently directed by David Michels. In 2013, its grant amounted to €842,976.

See also
 La Monnaie
 Royal Park Theatre
 Sylvan theater

References

Notes

External links

 

Theatres in Brussels
City of Brussels
1847 establishments in Belgium